Blanche Kelso Bruce (March 1, 1841March 17, 1898) was born into slavery in Prince Edward County, Virginia, and went on to become a politician who represented Mississippi as a Republican in the United States Senate from 1875 to 1881. He was the first elected African-American senator to serve a full term (Hiram R. Revels, also of Mississippi, was the first African American to serve in the U.S. Senate but did not complete a full term).

The Blanche K. Bruce House is a National Historic Landmark.

Early life and education

Bruce was born into slavery in 1841 in Prince Edward County, Virginia, near Farmville to Polly Bruce, an African-American woman who served as a domestic slave. His father was his master, Pettis Perkinson, a white Virginia planter. Bruce was treated comparatively well by his father, who educated him together with a legitimate half-brother. When Blanche Bruce was young, he played with his half-brother. One source claims that his father legally freed Blanche and arranged for an apprenticeship so he could learn a trade. In an 1886 newspaper interview, however, Bruce says that he gained his freedom by moving to Kansas as soon as hostilities broke out in the Civil War.

Career
Bruce taught school and attended for two years Oberlin College in Oberlin, Ohio. He next worked as a steamboat porter on the Mississippi River. In 1864, he moved to Hannibal, Missouri, where he established a school for black children.

In 1868, during Reconstruction, Bruce relocated to Bolivar near Cleveland in northwestern Mississippi, at which he purchased a Mississippi Delta plantation. He became a wealthy landowner of several thousand acres in the Mississippi Delta.  He was appointed to the positions of Tallahatchie County registrar of voters and tax assessor before he won an election for sheriff in Bolivar County.  He later was elected to other county positions, including tax collector and supervisor of education, while he also edited a local newspaper. He became sergeant-at-arms for the Mississippi State Senate in 1870.

In February 1874, Bruce was elected to the U.S. Senate, the second African American to serve in the upper house of Congress. On February 14, 1879, Bruce presided over the U.S. Senate, becoming the first African American (and the only former slave) to have done so. In 1880, James Z. George, a Confederate Army veteran and member of the Democratic Party, was elected to succeed Bruce.

At the 1880 Republican National Convention in Chicago, Bruce became the first African American to win any votes for national office at a major party's nominating convention, with eight votes for vice president. The presidential nominee that year was Ohio's James A. Garfield, who narrowly won election over the Democrat Winfield Scott Hancock.

Bruce served by appointment as the District of Columbia recorder of deeds from 1890 to 1893.  A Philadelphia newspaper reported his appointment in 1890, but persistent claims that his salary was $30,000 a year are not substantiated by any primary records.  He also served on the District of Columbia Board of Trustees of Public Schools from 1892 to 1895. He was a participant in the March 5, 1897 meeting to celebrate the memory of Frederick Douglass and the American Negro Academy led by Alexander Crummell. He was appointed as Register of the Treasury a second time in 1897 by President William McKinley and served until his death from diabetes complications in 1898.

Relationship with other African Americans
On the Bruce plantation in Mississippi, black sharecroppers lived in "flimsy wooden shacks," working in oppressive conditions similar to those on white-owned estates.

After his Senate term expired, Bruce remained in Washington, D.C., secured a succession of Republican patronage jobs and stumped for Republican candidates across the country. He acquired a large townhouse and summer home, and presided over black high society.

One newspaper wrote that Bruce did not approve of the designation "colored men." He often said, "I am a Negro and proud of it."

Personal life
On June 24, 1878, Bruce married Josephine Beall Willson (1853–1923), a fair-skinned socialite of Cleveland, Ohio, amid great publicity; the couple traveled to Europe for a four-month honeymoon.

Their only child, Roscoe Conkling Bruce, was born in 1879.  He was named for U.S. Senator Roscoe Conkling of New York, Bruce's mentor in the Senate. In 2002, scholar Molefi Kete Asante listed Blanche Bruce on his list of 100 Greatest African Americans.

In the fall of 1899, Josephine Bruce accepted the position of principal at Tuskegee Institute in Tuskegee, Alabama. While visiting Josephine at Tuskegee, during the summer break of his senior year at Harvard, Roscoe Bruce met Booker T. Washington and secured a position at Tuskegee as head of the Academic Department.

Honors and legacy

In 1975, the residence of Bruce in the Shaw neighborhood was made a National Historic Landmark.

In October 1999, the U.S. Senate commissioned a portrait of Bruce. African-American Washington D.C. artist Simmie Knox was selected in 2000 to paint the portrait, which was unveiled in the Capitol in 2001.

A historical highway marker marking Bruce's birthplace at the intersection of highway 360 and 623 near Green Bay, Prince Edward County, Virginia, was unveiled by the African American Heritage Preservation Foundation on March 1, 2006.

Bruce School 

In July 1898, the District of Columbia public school trustees ordered that a then-new public school building on Marshall Street in Park View be named the Bruce School in his honor. Marshall Street later became Kenyon Street and the Bruce School became Caesar Chavez Prep Middle School in 2009, named for the Mexican-American labor organizer Cesar Chavez. In 1973, the all-black Bruce School and James Monroe school were combined in a new campus as the integrated Bruce-Monroe. In 2008, the school was relocated to Park View and the old building demolished in 2009.

See also
 List of African-American United States senators

References

Bibliography
 
 
 
 Rabinowitz, Howard N., ed. Southern Black Leaders of the Reconstruction Era (1982), pp. 1–38.

External links

 Retrieved on 2009-03-26
 
 Biography and Joe Kelso.Tripod
 Review of The Senator and the Socialite
 The story of his life is retold in the radio drama "The Saga of Senator Blanche K Bruce", a presentation from Destination Freedom

|-

|-

|-

|-

1841 births
1898 deaths
African-American farmers
19th-century American farmers
African-American politicians during the Reconstruction Era
African-American sheriffs
African-American United States senators
African-American candidates for Vice President of the United States
Burials at Woodlawn Cemetery (Washington, D.C.)
District of Columbia Recorders of Deeds
Farmers from Mississippi
Mississippi Republicans
Mississippi sheriffs
Oberlin College alumni
People from Hannibal, Missouri
People from Farmville, Virginia
People of the Reconstruction Era
People of Missouri in the American Civil War
Republican Party United States senators from Mississippi
Washington, D.C., Republicans
People from Prince Edward County, Virginia